Convict Concerto  is the 58th animated cartoon short subject in the Woody Woodpecker series. Released theatrically on November 22, 1954, the film was produced by Walter Lantz Productions and distributed by Universal-International.

Plot 
Woody is a shy piano tuner who is held at gunpoint by a bank robber named Mugsy (Daws Butler) who is on the lam. Mugsy hides out inside the grand piano Woody is tuning, and directs him to start playing immediately. Mugsy plays part of Frédéric Chopin's Funeral March to threaten Woody, who replies with a rousing rendition of Franz Liszt's "Hungarian Rhapsody No. 2." He manages to play the entire piece while being harassed by the gun-wielding Mugsy as well as a bricks-for-brains policeman (also Daws Butler) hot on the trail of the stolen loot.

Notes 
 The normally red wood plank backdrop utilized during the opening theme when Woody bursts through a hole, announcing "Guess who?", is replaced with a light gray-colored wood backdrop starting with this entry. Woody also appears a lot smaller in this particular intro. This lighter background would be used until 1970, when the background reverts to a red wood plank for the remainder of the series, albeit with the smaller Woody Animation intact.
 Veteran Animator Hugh Harman is credited with Story here. Coincidentally, He and Lantz had worked together on the Oswald The Lucky Rabbit series back when it was produced under Charles Mintz. 
 Mugsy refers to Russian composer Sergei Rachmaninoff when he quips to Woody "Keep up the good work, Rachmaninoff!"
 Convict Concerto was Don Patterson's final effort as director on a Woody short, although he would stay on at Lantz as an animator until 1960's Heap Big Hepcat. He does not receive on-screen credit as director.
 Mugsy's voice was used by Daws Butler in a number of later cartoons for Hanna-Barbera.

References

External links 
 

1954 animated films
1954 films
1954 short films
Walter Lantz Productions shorts
Woody Woodpecker films
1950s American animated films
Universal Pictures animated short films
Animated films about birds
Animated films about animals
1950s English-language films